The 2004 Palau Soccer League was the first season of association football competition in Palau. The league was won by Daewoo Ngatpang The league consisted of three rounds of matches, a play-off final and was named the Palau Soccer Association Local League.

Teams
Four teams will compete in this inaugural season of the Palau Soccer League. All matches will played at the PCC Track & Field Stadium in Koror, home stadium to all the teams. This is due to the lack of suitable venues for soccer matches in Palau. The teams for 2004 (listed in alphabetical order) are:
Daewoo Ngatpang FC
Mount Everest Nepal FC
Palau Track and Field Team FC
Team Bangladesh FC

The location of the PCC Track & Field Stadium, where all games will take place:

League stage

Standings

Results
The 2004 season was played in two stages: the first stage was a group in which all teams played each other once. The top two teams then qualified for a one legged final to determine the overall champion.

Week 1

Week 2

Week 3

Knockout stage

Final

Top scorers

References

Palau Soccer League seasons
Palau
Soccer